Hemenway State Forest is a  state forest in Tamworth, New Hampshire. It includes the Big Pines Natural Area, an area of large white pine trees, including one of New Hampshire's largest, accessible via a parking area and loop trail off Route 113A. The trail also crosses the Swift River with a wooden pedestrian bridge. A spur trail connects to an observation tower atop Great Hill.

See also

List of New Hampshire state forests

References

External links
U.S. Geological Survey Map at the U.S. Geological Survey Map Website. Retrieved January 6th, 2022.

New Hampshire state forests
Protected areas of Carroll County, New Hampshire
Old-growth forests